Newark Showground is a showground in Newark, Nottinghamshire.  It makes up  of the former RAF Winthorpe Airfield which was purchased in 1964 by the Newark and Nottinghamshire Agricultural Society.

Events

LAMMA
The LAMMA agricultural machinery show  is no longer held here. The show is organised by the "Lincolnshire Agricultural Machinery Manufactures Association" and the Newark and Nottinghamshire Agricultural Society, and started in 1981 as a major showcase for the latest agricultural machinery for the local farms. But the event has grown with visitors from all over the British Isles.

In 2012, the LAMMA Show organisation was acquired by the company Briefing Media, the parent company of the trade publication Farmers Guardian.

New Wine North and East
The site is used for one week of every year by New Wine to run their North and East Festival.  New Wine have a permanent storage facility on the site where they keep their equipment throughout the rest of the year.

Newark Vintage Tractor and Heritage Show
This event is one of the largest Vintage Tractor events in the UK. This event founded in 2002 has grown rapidly. In 2009 the show featured International Harvester as its featured marque and gathered over a hundred examples with several notable ones. These included the First Farmall H tractor built at IH's Doncaster Plant in The UK and the last one built when the factory shut.

European Juggling Convention
Newark Showground was the venue for the European Juggling Convention in 2019.

References

Buildings and structures in Nottinghamshire
Tourist attractions in Nottinghamshire
Newark-on-Trent